The 1980–81 Sussex County Football League season was the 56th in the history of Sussex County Football League a football competition in England.

Division One

Division One featured 14 clubs which competed in the division last season, along with two new clubs, promoted from Division Two:
Hastings Town
Three Bridges

League table

Division Two

Division Two featured twelve clubs which competed in the division last season, along with two new clubs relegated from Division One:
Haywards Heath
Rye United

League table

References

1980-81
1980–81 in English football leagues